This is a list of hospitals in Peru. There are 1,078 hospitals in Peru. 38% of hospitals are private and the remaining 62% are public. The most important public hospital institutions are the Regional Government, the Social Security System (EsSalud) - see Healthcare in Peru.

National hospitals

Ministry of Health System 
Hospital Nacional Arzobispo Loayza (HNAL) - Lima
Hospital Nacional Cayetano Heredia (HNCH) - Lima
Hospital Nacional Docente Madre Niño San Bartolomé - Lima
Hospital Nacional Dos de Mayo (HNDM) - Lima
Hospital Nacional Hipólito Unanue (HNHU)- Lima
Hospital Nacional Sergio E. Bernales (HNSEB) - Lima
Hospital Nacional Daniel Alcides Carrión - Callao
Instituto Nacional de Salud del Niño - Hospital del Niño (INSN) - Lima
Instituto Nacional de Salud del Niño de San Borja (INSN-SB) - Lima
Instituto Nacional de Ciencias Neurológicas (INCN) - Lima
Instituto Nacional Materno Perinatal (INMP) - Lima
Instituto Nacional de Oftalmología (INO) - Lima
Instituto Nacional de Salud Mental Honorio Delgado-Hideyo Noguchi (INSM HD-HN) - Lima
Instituto Nacional de Rehabilitación y de la Amistad Perú-Japón Adriana Rebaza Flores (INR) - Lima
Instituto Nacional de Enfermedades Neoplásicas (INEN) - Lima

Social Security System (ESSALUD) 
Hospital Nacional Guillermo Almenara Irigoyen - Lima 
Hospital Nacional Edgardo Rebagliati Martins - Lima 
Hospital Nacional Alberto Sabogal Sologuren - Callao
Instituto Nacional Cardiovascular y del Corazón (INCOR) - Lima
Hospital Nacional Almanzor Aguinaga Asenjo - Chiclayo
Hospital Nacional Víctor Lazarte Echegaray - Trujillo
Hospital Nacional Ramiro Prialé - Huancayo
Hospital Nacional Carlos Alberto Seguín Escobedo - Arequipa
Hospital Nacional Sureste Adolfo Guevara Velasco - Cusco
Centros de Atención y Aislamiento Temporal - Villas ESSALUD (For COVID-19 patients) - In a lot of Peruvian cities.
National Telemedicine Center - Lince, Lima
National Center of Renal Health - Jesús María, Lima

Regional hospitals
Hospital Regional Docente de Trujillo
Hospital Regional de Áncash Eleazar Guzmán Barrón (HEGB) - Chimbote
Hospital Regional de Apoyo Victor Ramos Guardia - Huaraz
Hospital Regional Hermilio Valdizán Medrano - Huánuco
Hospital Regional Honorio Delgado Espinoza - Arequipa
Hospital Regional de Ayacucho - Ayacucho
Hospital Regional Guillermo Díaz de la Vega - Abancay
Hospital Subregional de Andahuaylas - Andahuaylas
Hospital Regional de Cusco - Cusco
Hospital Santa Rosa - Puerto Maldonado
Hospital Regional de Huacho - Huacho
Hospital Departamental de Huancavelica (HDH)
Hospital Regional de Huancavelica - Huancavelica
Hospital Regional de Puno - Puno
Hospital Regional Santa Rosa - Piura
Hospital Regional de Huánuco - Huánuco
Hospital Regional de Amazonas - Chachapoyas
Hospital Regional de Cajamarca - Cajamarca
Hospital Regional de Ica - Ica
Hospital Regional de Moquegua - Moquegua
Hospital Regional Hipólito Unanue - Tacna
Hospital Regional de Tumbes - Tumbes
Hospital Regional de San Martín - Moyobamba
Hospital Regional de Tarapoto - Tarapoto
Hospital Regional de Ucayali - Pucallpa
Hospital Regional Daniel Alcides Carrión - Cerro de Pasco
Hospital Regional Docente Daniel Alcides Carrión de Huancayo - Huancayo
Hospital Regional de Iquitos - Iquitos
Hospital Regional de Lambayeque - Chiclayo
Instituto Regional de Enfermedades Neoplásicas del Centro - Jauja
Instituto Regional de Enfermedades Neoplásicas del Norte - Trujillo
Instituto Regional de Enfermedades Neoplásicas del Sur - Arequipa
Instituto Regional de Oftalmología - Trujillo

Other hospitals
Hospital Central FAP - Lima
Hospital de Chancay - Chancay
Hospital de Emergencias José Casimiro Ulloa - Miraflores, Lima
Hospital de Emergencias Pediátricas (HEP) - La Victoria, Lima
Hospital de la Fuerza Aérea del Perú - Lima
Hospital Hermilio Valdizan - Santa Anita
Hospital General María Auxiliadora (HMA) - San Juan de Miraflores, Lima
Hospital Militar Central - Lima
Hospital Cono Norte y Callao Luis Negreiros Vega ESSALUD - Callao
Hospital Octavio Mongrut ESSALUD - San Miguel, Lima
Hospital Marino Molina  ESSALUD - Comas, Lima
Hospital Suarez Angamos ESSALUD - Miraflores, Lima
Hospital Albrecht ESSALUD - Trujillo
Hospital Carlos Alcantara ESSALUD - La Molina, Lima
Hospital Villa Panamericana (COVID-19) - Villa Panamericana de Villa El Salvador, Lima 
Hospital Centro Médico Naval Cirujano Santiago Tavara - Bellavista, Callao
Hospital Policía Nacional del Perú - Lima
Hospital Antonio Lorena - Cusco
Hospital Goyeneche - Arequipa
Hospital Geriatrico de la Policía Nacional del Perú - Lima
Hospital Rezola-Cañete - San Vicente
Hospital San José (HSJ) - Callao
Hospital Santa Rosa (HSR) - Pueblo Libre, Lima
Hospital Victor Larco Herrera - Magdalena del Mar
Diopsi Suyana - Curahuasi, Apurimac
Centros de Atención, Aislamiento Temporal y Seguimiento - MINSA (COVID-19) - In a lot of Peruvian cities.

References

Sources
 Superintendencia Nacional de Salud, Data on Peruvian hospitals. Retrieved 01/08/14.
 Global Health Intelligence, Information on Healthcare in emerging markets. Retrieved 12/15/14.

 
Peru
Hospitals
Peru